Rhian Emilie Wilkinson (born May 12, 1982) is a Canadian professional soccer coach and former player. She was most recently the head coach of Portland Thorns FC of the National Women's Soccer League (NWSL), where she led the team to the 2022 NWSL Championship.

As a player, Wilkinson made over 180 appearances for the Canadian national team and won Olympic bronze medals in 2012 and 2016. She played as a forward and a midfielder at the club level, but was primarily an attacking right fullback for the national team.

Early life
Wilkinson was born in Pointe-Claire, Quebec, to parents Keith Wilkinson and Shan Evans. Her Danish-born English father is a former director of the Canada national rugby union team. Her mother, Shan Evans, was born in  Wales. She has an older brother, David, and a twin sister named Sara.

In 1990, she relocated to Wales for one year, where she attended Bont Faen Primary School in Cowbridge. The school did not offer soccer to girls and Wilkinson's mother joined the Parent-Teacher Association to convince the school to have inclusive sports teams.

She attended Villa Maria High School in Montreal and was valedictorian of her class. She played soccer for the Quebec provincial team from 1997 to 1999 and was named most valuable player in 1999 after helping the club to the silver medal at the nationals. In 1997 and 1998, she helped the Lac St. Louis Lakers earn two silver medals at the national club championships. She was selected as the Greater Montreal Athletic Association's Most Valuable Soccer Player in 2000, and attended the national training centre camp for the under-19 Canadian national team in 2001. Wilkinson competed for the Lakeshore, a female ice hockey team, and also played rugby from 1998 to 1999.

Wilkinson majored in speech communication and English at the University of Tennessee and was chosen as the University of Tennessee's Lady Vols' Offensive Most Valuable Player in 2002.

Club career
Wilkinson was named to the 2003 W-League All Star team and the 2004 W-League Championship All-Tournament team. She won the W-League 2005 scoring championship and tied for the assist leader with 38 points on 13 goals and 12 assists.

She began playing for Team Strømmen of the Toppserien (Norwegian league) in autumn 2005 and maintained her relationship with the club over the course of eight seasons.

In 2013, she played for the Boston Breakers in the new National Women's Soccer League. She played several games for Boston as a midfielder, scoring twice.

She signed with the Laval Comets of the W-League in 2014.

In 2015, Wilkinson joined Portland Thorns FC of the National Women's Soccer League through NWSL Player Allocation. In February 2016, the Thorns announced that Wilkinson would not play for the team in 2016, and she became unaffiliated.

International career
Wilkinson won bronze with Canada at the 2007 Pan American Games, and gold at the 2011 Pan American Games where Canada defeated Brazil 4–3 in penalty kicks. She captured an Olympic bronze medal at London 2012 after Canada defeated France 1–0 on August 9, 2012, in Coventry, England. She contributed three assists in the first two games for Canada at the 2014 Cyprus Cup. Wilkinson announced her retirement from international football on January 13, 2017.

Coaching career
Wilkinson was a volunteer assistant coach at her alma mater Tennessee Volunteers. She also served as an assistant coach for the Canadian women's national team in 2019 and 2020, while leading their under-20 and under-17 programs.

In February 2021, Wilkinson was appointed as assistant manager of the England women's national football team with Hege Riise in charge. Riise and Wilkinson also coached the Great Britain women's Olympic football team in 2021.

In November 2021, Wilkinson was named head coach of Portland Thorns FC of the National Women's Soccer League (NWSL). She led the team to a second-place finish in the regular season, followed by winning the 2022 NWSL Championship 2–0 over the Kansas City Current. Despite the on-field success, the Thorns players asked for Wilkinson's resignation after an investigation into her relationship with a specific player, and Wilkinson left her role in December 2022.

Personal life
Wilkinson plays the cello for fun and played the trumpet in high school, and has been a member of the Suzuki Strings Orchestra since 1994. She participated in the 1997 Quebec Winter Games in ringette.

Honours

Playing 
Canada
 Summer Olympic Games: bronze medal: 2012, 2016
 Pan American Games: 2011

Individual
 Canada Soccer Hall of Fame: 2022
 "Maurice" Award: 2008
 Canada Soccer Fans' Choice Award: 2007
Senior Excellence Women Player: 2007
 Southeastern Conference (SEC) Freshman of the Year: 2000

Coaching 
Portland Thorns FC

 NWSL Championship: 2022

References

External links

 / Canada Soccer Hall of Fame

1982 births
Living people
Canada women's international soccer players
Women's association football forwards
Women's association football defenders
Soccer people from Quebec
Canadian people of English descent
Canadian people of Welsh descent
People from Pointe-Claire
Tennessee Volunteers women's soccer players
Canadian expatriate soccer players
Anglophone Quebec people
Expatriate women's soccer players in the United States
Expatriate women's footballers in Norway
FIFA Century Club
2003 FIFA Women's World Cup players
2007 FIFA Women's World Cup players
2011 FIFA Women's World Cup players
2015 FIFA Women's World Cup players
Footballers at the 2007 Pan American Games
Footballers at the 2008 Summer Olympics
Footballers at the 2011 Pan American Games
Footballers at the 2012 Summer Olympics
National Women's Soccer League players
Boston Breakers players
Olympic soccer players of Canada
Olympic medalists in football
Olympic bronze medalists for Canada
Pan American Games silver medalists for Canada
Pan American Games bronze medalists for Canada
Medalists at the 2012 Summer Olympics
Medalists at the 2016 Summer Olympics
Canadian expatriate sportspeople in Norway
Canadian expatriate sportspeople in the United States
Canadian twins
Twin sportspeople
Portland Thorns FC players
Pan American Games gold medalists for Canada
Footballers at the 2016 Summer Olympics
Canadian women's soccer players
Pan American Games medalists in football
University of Tennessee alumni
Medalists at the 2011 Pan American Games
Medalists at the 2007 Pan American Games
Canadian women's soccer coaches
Portland Thorns FC coaches
National Women's Soccer League coaches
Female association football managers
Lakers du Lac Saint-Louis players
Ottawa Fury (women) players
USL W-League (1995–2015) players
Laval Comets players